Kevin Elgestål (born May 29, 1996) is a Swedish professional ice hockey right winger. He is currently playing with Stenungsund HF in the Hockeytvåan (Div.3).

Playing career
Elgestål made his Swedish Hockey League debut playing with Frölunda HC during the 2013–14 SHL season.

On June 26, 2014, Elgestål was drafted in the 7th round of the 2014 NHL Entry Draft, 194th overall, by the Washington Capitals of the National Hockey League (NHL).

Elgestål continued his tenure with Frölunda HC, however after being un-signed by the Capitals and also unable to break into the SHL team, he left the club to sign with second-tier club, HC Vita Hästen, in the HockeyAllsvenskan (Allsv).

Career statistics

Regular season and playoffs

International

References

External links

1996 births
DVTK Jegesmedvék players
Frölunda HC players
HC Vita Hästen players
Living people
Ice hockey people from Gothenburg
Swedish ice hockey right wingers
Washington Capitals draft picks